Cop au Vin is a 1985 French crime film directed by Claude Chabrol. It was entered into the 1985 Cannes Film Festival. The original French title is a pun: it literally means "vinegar chicken," but "poulet" is also French slang for "cop." Chabrol made a sequel in 1986 titled Inspecteur Lavardin.

Plot
In a small town in France, Louis lives in a large tumbledown house where he looks after his disabled and eccentric mother and works by day as the postman. Henriette, the post office clerk, keeps trying to inveigle him but, in addition to the demands of his mother, he spends his evenings spying on his three enemies. These are three leading citizens who have formed a syndicate to buy and develop his house: the lawyer Lavoisier, the doctor Morasseau, and the butcher Filiol. As he and his mother refuse all offers from this unpleasant trio, the two are subject to continual harassment.

One day when Filiol is particularly obnoxious, Louis that night puts sugar in the tank of his car. A resulting accident kills the butcher and brings to town the police detective Lavardin. Not averse to beating and waterboarding suspects, he finds that things are considerably more complex. The lawyer Lavoisier has a mistress, Anna, who is friendly with the doctor Morasseau's wife, Delphine, but in quick succession both women vanish. After another accident, an unrecognisably charred corpse is recovered from Delphine's car. Deducing that it is in fact that of Anna, Lavardin has to work out where Delphine is and why she has disappeared.

The motive emerges when he learns that it was Delphine's money which the syndicate were relying on for their plans and that she was instead leaving to start a new life with a lover. Freshly arrived in Morasseau's garden is a plaster cast of a nude Delphine, in the base of which Lavardin finds her body. Henriette at last gets Louis into her bed, breaking his mother's hold over him, and Lavardin says he will forget about the sugar in the tank.

Cast
 Jean Poiret as Inspecteur Jean Lavardin
 Stéphane Audran as Madame Cuno
 Michel Bouquet as Hubert Lavoisier
 Jean Topart as Docteur Philippe Morasseau
 Lucas Belvaux as Louis Cuno
 Pauline Lafont as Henriette
 Caroline Cellier as Anna Foscarie
 Andrée Tainsy as Marthe
 Jean-Claude Bouillaud as Gérard Filiol
 Jacques Frantz as Alexandre Duteil
 Josephine Chaplin as Delphine Morasseau
 Albert Dray as André, le barman
 Henri Attal as L'employé de la morgue
 Marcel Guy as Le maître d'hôtel
 Dominique Zardi as Henri Rieutord, chef de poste

Reception
Jonathan Rosenbaum in Chicago Reader said "it wasn't a masterpiece, but at the very least it was a well-crafted and satisfying entertainment" that had "sex, violence, dark wit, a superb sense of both the corruption and meanness of life in the French provinces, a good whodunit plot, Balzacian characters... and very nice camera work by Jean Rabier." Time Out remarked "it is all done with the skittishness which Chabrol brings to this kind of policier, but given edge by his very mocking eye." Variety said "the plotting here wouldn’t pass muster on an episode of PBS’ “Mystery!,” but there’s pleasure to be had in veteran thesp Jean Poiret’s soaked-in-vinegar turn as Lavardin, a gimlet-eyed sleuth with a violent streak that surfaces unexpectedly, yet always at just the right moments."

Sequels
Chabrol directed a sequel, Inspecteur Lavardin, in 1986. It was followed by a four-part TV series, Les Dossiers de l'inspecteur Lavardin (1989-1990), also starring Jean Poiret.

References

External links

1985 films
1980s crime films
1980s mystery films
French mystery films
1980s French-language films
Films directed by Claude Chabrol
Films produced by Marin Karmitz
Films based on French novels
Police detective films
1980s French films